Francis Drummond Greville Stanley (1839—1897) was an architect in Queensland, Australia. He was the Queensland Colonial Architect. Many of his designs are now heritage-listed buildings.

Early life
Stanley was born in Edinburgh, Scotland, on 1 January 1839, the son of actor and painter Montague Talbot Stanley and his wife Mary Susan (née Eyre).

Stanley studied and practised architecture in Edinburgh, prior to emigrating to Brisbane in 1861–2. There, he joined the Lands Department in 1863 and became the chief clerk of works, under the Colonial Architect Charles Tiffin.

On 27 April 1865, he married Margaret Bennet at Toowoomba.

His younger brother, Henry Charles Stanley, was also an early immigrant to Queensland, becoming the Chief Engineer of the Queensland railways. His niece, Gwendolyn Stanley was an artist.

Career
Stanley was himself appointed to the post of Queensland Colonial Architect in July 1873. He held the post until 1881.

Works

 1872: General Post Office, Brisbane
 1873: Roma Street railway station, Brisbane
 1874: the first Cape Capricorn Light, near Rockhampton
 1877: Maryborough Courthouse
 1879: Supreme Court of Queensland, Brisbane
 1879: Queensland National Bank (former), Townsville
 1880: Toowoomba Post Office 
 1882: Australian Joint Stock Bank Building, Maryborough 
1882: Queensland Club
 1883: the rectory of Christ Church, Milton, Brisbane
 1884: Union Bank of Australia (now Perc Tucker Regional Gallery), Townsville
1884: first Lennons Hotel in Brisbane
 1888: Australian Joint Stock Bank Building (former), Townsville
 1889: Tighnabruaich, Indooroopilly, a residence built for his brother, Henry.
 1893: St Ann's Industrial School, now part of All Hallows' School, Brisbane

Later years
Stanley was interested in astronomy and built an observatory at his home. It was equipped with a powerful telescope, housed under a retractable roof. He used this to observe the transit of Mercury, in November 1894.

In August 1896, Stanley took up government employment again as an Inspector of Works.

Stanley died of tuberculosis on Friday 28 May 1897, at his home Ardencraig in Church Street - later Jephson Street - in the Toowong district of Brisbane. With classic symptoms of extrapulmonary TB, he had caught a chill three weeks previously, which developed into a paralysis of his lower body. He was buried in Toowong Cemetery.

His widow Margaret died on 14 September 1921 at Witherslack, Chelmer and was buried in the Anglican Cemetery of St. Matthews, in neighbouring Sherwood.

References

External links 

Architects from Brisbane
1839 births
1897 deaths
Burials at Toowong Cemetery
19th-century Australian architects
Francis Drummond Greville Stanley buildings
Architects from Edinburgh
Scottish emigrants to colonial Australia